The Pendergrass Building is a historic commercial building at 6 West Main Street in Franklin, North Carolina. The two-story brick building was built in 1904, and is a virtually unaltered example of retail construction of the period.  It was used as a retail store until 1975.

The building is now home to the Macon County Historical Society and Museum.

The building was listed on the National Register of Historic Places in 1991.

See also
National Register of Historic Places listings in Macon County, North Carolina

References

External links
Macon County Historical Society

Commercial buildings on the National Register of Historic Places in North Carolina
Buildings and structures in Macon County, North Carolina
Buildings designated early commercial in the National Register of Historic Places
Museums in Macon County, North Carolina
National Register of Historic Places in Macon County, North Carolina

Commercial buildings completed in 1904